Herbert Sigmund Eisner (23 June 1921 – 28 June 2011)  was a British-German scientist whose work led to high-expansion fire fighting foam. He was also a playwright.

Early life
He was born in Berlin.

His maternal grandfather knew the composer Richard Strauss and had founded Germany's first department store, the Grand Bazaar, in Frankfurt. His mother was a Wagnerian singer who holidayed with the playwright Bertolt Brecht. The family lived near the Tiergarten (Animal Garden) in central Berlin, and as a result often saw Joseph Goebbels walking to work. His aunt was Lotte H. Eisner, a German-French film critic, notably of German Expressionism, and a friend Leni Riefenstahl, the film director.

In 1936 he was sent to Buxton College, a boys' grammar school in Derbyshire. His parents left Berlin in 1939 and moved to London. When war broke out he was sent to the Isle of Man, with future members of the Amadeus Quartet. He joined the British Army, taking the surname Evans, and was sent to Kerala where he repaired tanks, becoming a Staff Sergeant.

He later read Physics at University College, Nottingham (the University of Nottingham).

Career
He worked for most of his life at the Safety in Mines Research Establishment (SMRE) in north-west Derbyshire until 1981.

Fire-fighting foam
In 1956 he carried out work on high-expansion foam to extinguish fires, which would lead directly to foam manufactured as a fire extinguishing agent. In 1964 Walter Kidde & Company (now called Kidde) bought the patents for high expansion foam.

Author
In the 1960s he wrote radio plays for BBC Radio 4 (the Home Service) and, in 1974 published a children's book, The Monster Plant

Personal life
In 1948 he married Gisela Spanglet, who came to Britain aged 13 with the Kindertransport, having met her at university in Nottingham.  In 1951 they moved to Buxton. They had two daughters and two sons. One of the sons is a violinist with the London Philharmonic Orchestra, who married Jessica Duchen, a novelist and classical music journalist and writer, in 1989. One of his daughters became a GP, and another son, David Eisner,  became a Professor of Physiology at the University of Manchester and married another physiologist, Susan Wray.   Herbert Eisner  died in Harrogate in 2011.

References

External links
 His violinist son
 His son BHF Professor Cardiac Physiology at the University of Manchester

1921 births
2011 deaths
Alumni of the University of Nottingham
History of firefighting
German emigrants to the United Kingdom
People educated at Buxton College
People from Buxton
Scientists from Berlin
English male dramatists and playwrights
20th-century English dramatists and playwrights
Writers from Berlin
British Army soldiers
British Army personnel of World War II
20th-century English male writers